Gaetano Mares (1793–1862) was an Italian conductor. He notably conducted the world premieres of Giuseppe Verdi's Ernani (1844), Attila (opera) (1846), Rigoletto (1851) and La traviata (1853) at La Fenice in Venice.

References

1793 births
1862 deaths
Italian conductors (music)
Italian male conductors (music)
19th-century Italian musicians
19th-century Italian male musicians